This is a list of flag bearers who have represented Andorra at the Olympics.

Flag bearers carry the national flag of their country at the opening ceremony of the Olympic Games.

See also
Andorra at the Olympics

References

Andorra at the Olympics
Andorra
Olympic